"First Night" is a song recorded by American rock band Survivor. It was the final charting single from their 1984 album Vital Signs, reaching number 53 on the Billboard Hot 100 on September 7, 1985.

Charts

References 

1985 singles
Survivor (band) songs
Songs written by Jim Peterik
Songs written by Frankie Sullivan
1985 songs